This is a list of Historical markers in the city of Prescott in Yavapai County, Arizona.

See also
National Register of Historic Places listings in Prescott, Arizona
List of National Historic Landmarks in Arizona

References

Historical markers, Prescott
Arizona, Prescott
Historical markers
Arizona, Prescott, historical markers
Arizona-related lists